Knema is a genus of plant in family Myristicaceae, mostly consisting of small-medium trees found in lowland tropical forests from Asia to New Guinea. The highest diversity of species is in Borneo.

Species
Species includes the following:

References

 
Flora of Indo-China
Myristicaceae genera
Taxonomy articles created by Polbot